The Blue Water 24 is an American trailerable sailboat that was designed by Thomas C. Gillmer as a blue water cruiser and first built in 1961.

The design was developed into the Passage 24 in 1979, using a new coach house on the existing hull design.

Production
The Blue Water 24 design was a commission by Blue Water Boats who had it built by Holden Laminates in the United States starting in 1961, but it is now out of production.

Design
The Blue Water 24 is a recreational keelboat, built predominantly of fiberglass, with wood trim. It has a masthead sloop rig and can also be cutter rigged. The hull has a raked stem, an angled transom, a keel-mounted rudder controlled by a tiller and a fixed long keel. It displaces  and carries  of ballast.

The boat is fitted with a Universal Atomic 4  gasoline engine for docking and maneuvering.

The design has sleeping accommodation for four people, with a double "V"-berth in the bow cabin and two quarter berths in the main cabin. The galley is located on the port side just aft of the bow cabin. The head is located opposite the galley on the starboard side.

For sailing the design is equipped with a large headsail genoa and a 3/4 jib, that can be used in any combinations.

Operational history
In a 2010 review Steve Henkel wrote, "best features: The broad bowsprit with a pulpit extended over it gives good purchase for dealing with an anchor We also like the big portlights in the doghouse, the better to check out one’s neighbors in a cozy anchorage. Worst features: ... Of the four comp[etitor]s listed below, the Blue Water 24 has by far the least enticing accommodations plan. For example, there appears to be no dining table, nor any place to put one. And the enclosed head compartment is located smack dab amidships, leaving only an 18-inch space to stand in front of the galley."

See also
List of sailing boat types

References

Keelboats
1960s sailboat type designs
Sailing yachts
Trailer sailers
Sailboat types built by Holden Laminates
Sailboat type designs by Thomas C. Gillmer